Joseph Francis Cullen (1 February 1849 – 31 March 1917), Australian journalist and politician, was a Member of Parliament in New South Wales and Western Australia.

Born in Jamberoo, New South Wales around 1849, Joseph Cullen was the son of farmer John Cullen and Rebecca Clinton. His brother William was also a member of the New South Wales parliament and became Chief Justice of New South Wales. Joseph Cullen was educated at state schools before attending Camden College in Sydney. On 18 April 1878 he married Annie Butler, with whom he had one son and two daughters.

Cullen became congregational minister for Windsor, North Sydney, North Willoughby and Watson's Bay. He resigned in 1886, and shortly afterwards purchased and edited a North Sydney newspaper.

He was elected to the New South Wales Legislative Assembly on a Free Trade ticket for St Leonards at the 1889 election. He held the seat until the election of 1894, when multi-member districts were abolished. St Leonards was split into three with the new districts being Warringah and Willoughby. Cullen was the Free Trade candidate for Willoughby, winning the election in July 1894.  He was forced to resign 4 months later due to insolvency, being made bankrupt on 21 November 1894. He re-contested Willoughby at the resulting by-election however there were 3 free trade candidates and he was defeated by Edward Clark.

In 1904, Cullen emigrated to Western Australia, spending two years on the Eastern Goldfields.  Settling at Katanning, he was owner and editor of the Great Southern Herald from 1906. On 4 October 1909, he was elected to the Western Australian Legislative Council in a by-election for the South-East Province. He held the seat until his death at Katanning on 31 March 1917.

References

 

1849 births
1917 deaths
Free Trade Party politicians
Members of the Western Australian Legislative Council
Members of the New South Wales Legislative Assembly
People from Katanning, Western Australia